Sebastiania serrata is a species of flowering plant in the family Euphorbiaceae. It was originally described as Gymnanthes serrata Baill. ex Müll.Arg. in 1863. It is native from southeastern and southern Brazil to northeastern Argentina.

References

Plants described in 1863
Flora of Brazil
Flora of Argentina
serrata
Taxa named by Henri Ernest Baillon
Taxa named by Johannes Müller Argoviensis